Prosolanapyrone-III cycloisomerase (Sol5, SPS, solanapyrone synthase (bifunctional enzyme: prosolanapyrone II oxidase/prosolanapyrone III cyclosiomerase)) is an enzyme with systematic name prosolanapyrone-III:(-)-solanapyrone A isomerase. This enzyme catalyses the following chemical reaction

 prosolanapyrone III  (-)-solanapyrone A

The enzyme is involved in the biosynthesis of the phytotoxin solanapyrone in some fungi.

References

External links 
 

EC 5.5.1